Anthony J. Steinbock is an American philosopher and Professor of Philosophy at Stony Brook University, New York. He is the Director of the Phenomenology Research Center, editor-in-chief of Continental Philosophy Review and a co-editor-in-chief of Phenomenological Reviews. Steinbock is known for his research on phenomenology.

Books
 It’s Not about the Gift: From Givenness to Loving (2018)
 Limit-Phenomena and Phenomenology in Husserl (2017)
 Moral Emotions: Reclaiming the Evidence of the Heart (2014) Recipient of the 2015 Symposium Book Award
 Phenomenology and Mysticism: The Verticality of Religious Experience Recipient of the 2009 Edward Goodwin Ballard Book Prize in Phenomenology
 Home and Beyond: Generative Phenomenology after Husserl 
Translation of Edmund Husserl, Analyses Concerning Passive and Active Syntheses: Lectures on Transcendental Logic, Husserliana Collected Works, IX (Dordrecht: Kluwer Academic Publishers, 2001), pp. 659 + lx “Translator’s Introduction.”

References

External links
 Anthony J. Steinbock
 
 
 

21st-century American philosophers
Phenomenologists
Continental philosophers
Philosophers of art
Kant scholars
Philosophy academics
Heidegger scholars
Husserl scholars
Living people
1949 births
Philosophy journal editors